Niels Alexander Lassen (December 7, 1926 – April 30, 1997) was a Danish nuclear medicine physician, neurologist and pioneer in the fields of neuroimaging, neuropsychiatry and nuclear medicine. He was born and died in Copenhagen.

Lassen has been called the greatest Danish brain researcher since Niels Steensen.

Career 
His father, H. C. A. Lassen, was professor at the University of Copenhagen, and Niels Lassen graduated as medical doctor from the same university in 1951. These efforts were summarized in a Scientific American article in 1978.

He was employed at Bispebjerg Hospital in 1958 to 1996. From 1963 he established and lead the department of Clinical Physiology. He wrote 710 scientific publications in the periode 1954-2000+. 
He was married to Edda Sveinsdottir who as a computer scientist helped with the development of the (at that time) advanced computer technology for image construction of the regional brain measurements.

The Niels Lassen Award

There is a Niels Lassen Award presented by the International Society for Cerebral Blood Flow and Metabolism (ISCBFM). ((The Danish medical doctor, brain researcher and "science entertainer" Peter Lund Madsen was a student of Niels A. Lassen, and Peter Lund Madsen received the Niels A. Lassen Prize in 2002.))

Previous recipients have included :
 1999 - Matthias Endres, Mass. General Hospital, Harvard University, Boston, USA and the Exp. Neurology, Charite, Humboldt University, Berlin, Germany
 2001 - Sylvain Doré, Departments of Anesthesiology/Critical Care Medicine and Neuroscience, Johns Hopkins School of Medicine, Baltimore, Maryland, USA
 2003 - Fahmeed Hyder, Department of Diagnostic Radiology, Yale University, New Haven, CT, USA
 2005 - Kirsten Caesar, Department of Medical Physiology, Copenhagen University, Copenhagen, Denmark 
 2007 - Kazuhiko Hayashi, Osaka University Graduate School of Medicine, Suita, Osaka, Japan
 2009 - Alyson A. Miller, Monash University, Melbourne, Australia
 2011 - Virginia Newcombe, University of Cambridge, Cambridge, UK
 2013 - Peiying Li, Fudan University, Shanghai, China
 2015 - Sjoerd Finnema, Yale University, New Haven, CT, USA

Lassen himself received the Novo Nordisk Prize in 1968, from the Novo Nordisk Foundation. and was the first recipient of the inaugural International Society for Cerebral Blood Flow and Metabolism (ISCBFM) Lifetime Achievement Award in 1997.

References

Bibliography 
 Niels A. Lassen, William A. Perl, Tracer kinetic methods in medical physiology, Raven, New York City, 1979. .
 Olaf B. Paulson, "Niels A. Lassen (1926-1997)", In Festskrift. Dansk Neurologisk Selskab 1900-2000, Jørgen Therkelsen(editor), Lægeforeningens forlag, Copenhagen, 2000.
 
 

1926 births
1997 deaths
Danish neurologists
Academic awards
20th-century Danish physicians